Amplified // A Decade of Reinventing the Cello is the second greatest hits, double album by Finnish band Apocalyptica.

Track listing

Credits

Apocalyptica
Eicca Toppinen – cello; music (CD 1 (2, 5 & 11–13) & CD 2 (1–7) & Limited Edition), double bass, percussion, and arrangements
Perttu Kivilaakso – cello; music (CD 1 (6, 7 & 14)), programming
Paavo Lötjönen – cello 
Mikko Sirén – drums (CD 1 (7 & 14) & CD 2 (1, 3, 5 & 7) Limted Edition); programming

Additional personnel

Other
Kai "Hiili" Hiilesmaa – percussion on "Cult"
Mika Jussila – mastering
Niina Pasanen – music styling

Engineering and recording
Jyrki Tuovinen – engineering (10), recording
T-T Oksala – mixed, programming, recording

Drummers
Dave Lombardo –  CD 1 (5 & 6)
Sami Kuoppamäki – CD 1 (11 & 12) & "Faraway"

Ex-Apocalyptica members on Plays Metallica by Four Cellos and Inquisition Symphony
Antero Manninen 
Max Lilja – also on "Cult"

Double bassists
Mikko Moilanen – CD 1 (6 & 14) 
Ville Väätäinen – CD 2 (12)

Violinists on Reflections
Jyrki Lasonpalo 
Kerim Gribajcevic 
Lotta Nykäsenoja

"Seemann"
Nina Hagen – vocals
Michael Wolff – vocal painting 
Mikko Raita – mixing and recording
Oliver Riedel – songwriting
Teijo Jämsä – drums

Vocalists and others
Bittersweet
Lauri Ylönen – lyrics, vocals also on "Life Burns!" 
Ville Valo – lyrics

Quutamo
Manu – on "En Vie"
Marta Jandová – on "How Far" & "Wie Weit"

Repressed
Max Cavalera – lyrics, also songwriting on "Refuse/Resist"
Matt Tuck – lyrics

Path Vol. 2
Sandra Nasić – lyrics
Clemens Matzenik – engineering at Horus

Hope Vol.2
Matthias Sayer – lyrics 
Jeff Collier – lyrics

Faraway
Linda Sundblad – vocals 
 Juhani Lagerspetz – piano

Metallica songwriting credits
Metallica
James Hetfield
Kirk Hammett – Only on CD 1 (1 & 3)
Cliff Burton – Only on "Master of Puppets"
Lars Ulrich

Other writers
Edvard Grieg – "Hall of the Mountain King"
Jeff Hanneman – "Angel of Death"

References

Apocalyptica albums
2006 compilation albums
2006 classical albums